The Printing Museum (Japanese: 印刷博物館) is a museum in Bunkyo-ku, Tokyo, Japan. It is dedicated to the history and techniques of printing, and is located in the head office building of Toppan Printing.

See also
 List of museums in Tokyo
 History of printing

Notes

External links
 

Museums in Tokyo
Printing press museums
Industry museums in Japan
Buildings and structures in Bunkyō